Galagete is a moth genus in the subfamily Autostichinae.

Species
 Galagete cinerea Landry, 2002
 Galagete consimilis Landry, 2002
 Galagete cristobalensis Landry, 2002
 Galagete darwini Landry, 2002
 Galagete espanolaensis Landry, 2002
 Galagete gnathodoxa (Meyrick, 1926)
 Galagete griseonana Schmitz & Landry, 2005
 Galagete krameri Landry & Schmitz, 2008
 Galagete levequei Landry, 2002
 Galagete pecki Landry, 2002
 Galagete protozona (Meyrick, 1926)
 Galagete seymourensis Landry, 2002
 Galagete turritella Landry, 2002

References

 
Autostichinae